HMS Defender was a 12-gun Archer-class gun-brig built in Chester in 1804 and employed in the English Channel. On 14 December 1809, she was wrecked near Folkestone.

Commanding officers
August 1804, Lieutenant George Hayes
November 1804, Lieutenant John George Nops
1806, Lieutenant George Plowman 
February 1809, Lieutenant Frederick William Burgoyne

References
 
 

 

Brigs of the Royal Navy
1804 ships
Ships built in England
Maritime incidents in 1809
Shipwrecks of England
Shipwrecks in the English Channel